is a Japanese manga series written and illustrated by Hosana Tanaka. It was serialized in Shōnen Gahōsha's seinen manga magazine Young King OURs from October 2014 to August 2018, with its chapters collected in seven tankōbon volumes. The series was licensed for English release in North America by Seven Seas Entertainment

Synopsis
The story is set in an alternate fifteenth century Rome, where witches have declared war against humanity.  is a young monk adopted by the Catholic Church, whose parents were murdered by a witch. To revive them, however, Nikola must form a marriage contract with each one. Nikola, thus, becomes the key to make the First Witches the Church's greatest weapons and save the world.

Publication
Shōnen Gahōsha collected its chapters in seven tankōbon volumes, released from May 30, 2015, to October 30, 2018.

The series was licensed for English release in North America by Seven Seas Entertainment. The seven volumes were published from November 29, 2016, to May 28, 2019.

Volume list

References

Further reading

External links

Dark fantasy anime and manga
Harem anime and manga
Historical fantasy anime and manga
Seinen manga
Seven Seas Entertainment titles
Shōnen Gahōsha manga
Witchcraft in anime and manga